This is a list of uniform acts.

List

Non-NCCUSL model laws

Model Penal Code
The Model Penal Code, which seeks to harmonize state criminal law statutes, is in effect a uniform act but it was developed by the American Law Institute and not the NCCUSL.

Other model laws
The National Association of Insurance Commissioners (NAIC) has written a large number of model laws and model regulations that heavily influence insurance law and regulation throughout the United States.

The Uniform Auction and Auctioneer Licensing Act (2006) is a sample law, proposed by the National Auctioneers Association, intended to be used by states as a template when drafting their own legislation governing auctions and auctioneers.

Other notable non-NCCUSL model laws include the Uniform Vehicle Code, the Model State Emergency Health Powers Act, the Model Business Corporation Act, the Model Nonprofit Corporation Act, UNCITRAL Model Law on International Commercial Arbitration and the Model Vital Statistics Act (1992).

See also
State law
Uniform act
Uniform Law Commission

References

External links
 The National Conference of Commissioners on Uniform State Laws
 NCCUSL's List of Uniform Acts

Uniform Acts